Northville Township is located in LaSalle County, Illinois. As of the 2010 census, its population was 7,410 and it contained 3,143 housing units.

Geography

The Communities of Sandwich, Sheridan, Northville, and Somonauk all contribute to the township's population, and with the township's recent growth, coupled with the difficulty of the county to respond quickly to the remote corner of the county, a County Sheriff Substation was constructed south of the Sandwich neighborhood of Lake Holiday.  Sheridan, which mostly sits within Mission Township to the south, actually has a small area on the north side of the Fox River, which sits within the Northville Township limits.

Demographics

Communities
Lake Holiday (CDP)
Millington*
Northville (Unincorporated community)
Sandwich*
Sheridan (mostly located within Mission Township)
Somonauk*
Wildwood (Unincorporated subdivision, claimed by the City of Sandwich
Note: The star (*) denotes partial or full placement within a neighboring county

References

External links
US Census
City-data.com
Illinois State Archives

Populated places established in 1849
Townships in LaSalle County, Illinois
Townships in Illinois
1849 establishments in Illinois